Soweto Green is a 1995 South African comedy film directed by David Lister and starring John Kani, L. Scott Caldwell and Casper de Vries. Following the election of Nelson Mandela as president, a middle-class American couple relocate to Johannesburg to help build the new society.

Cast
 John Kani ...  Dr. Curtis Tshabalala
 L. Scott Caldwell ...  Cora Tshabalala
 Casper de Vries ...  Adrian Fluit
 Sandra Prinsloo ...  Amanda Fluit
 Cobus Rossouw ...  Voseie Fluit
 Zukile Ggobose ...  Looksmart
 Nkhensani Manganyi ...  Thandeka
 Connie Mfuku ...  Mawe
 Daphney Hlomuka ...  Tryphina
 Muso Sefatsa ...  Thandeka
 Sue Pam Grant ...  Amelia
 Martin Le Maitre ...  Aubrey
 Francois Stemmer ...  Leon
 Dambuza Mdledle ...  Dr. Davel
 Thulane Grubane ...  Uncle Ho
 Babsy Selela ...  Lenin
 Nadia Bilchik ...  Kugel 1
 Eleni Cousins ...  Kugel 2
 Crispin De Nuys ...  Mao
 Barbara Nielsen ...  Eva
 Greg Melvill-Smith ...  Fritz
 Alan T. Mark ...  Malhond

References

External links

Journal of African Cinemas: special edition on contemporary South African cinema  

1995 films
1995 comedy films
1990s English-language films
English-language South African films
South African comedy films
Films directed by David Lister